The 2nd Combat Aviation Brigade is a military formation of the Republic of Korea Army. The brigade is subordinated to the Army Aviation Operations Command (Republic of Korea).

History 
On 1 September 1973, it was founded as the 1st Aviation Group.

On 1 June 1978, it was transferred to the newly established 1st Aviation Brigade and changed its name to 61st Aviation Group. In addition, the 202nd and 203rd aviation battalions, operating UH-1H as subordinate units, were created.

In order to suppress the Gwangju Uprising in 1980, in accordance with the “Helicopter Operation Plan” of the Army Headquarters, Brigadier General Song Jin-won ordered the unit, along with 1st Aviation Brigade to deployed to Gwangju city on 22 May.

Organization 

Headquarters
 60th Aviation Group (Air Command and Control unit)
 301st Aviation Battalion (CH-47D)
 302nd Aviation Battalion (CH-47D)
 601st Aviation Battalion (UH-60)
 603rd Aviation Battalion (UH-60) (garrisoned in Sejong City)
 605th Aviation Battalion (UH-60) (garrisoned in Sejong City)

References 

Republic of Korea Army
Military units and formations established in 1973
Icheon
Sejong City
Gwangju Uprising